John Street (born 27 July 1934) is an English former professional footballer who played as a winger.

Career
Born in Sheffield, Street signed for Bradford City in November 1951 from 'minor football'. He made 1 league appearance for the club, before moving to Lincoln City in September 1952.

Sources

References

1934 births
Living people
English footballers
Bradford City A.F.C. players
Lincoln City F.C. players
English Football League players
Association football wingers